Clerodendrum paniculatum, the pagoda flower, is a species of flowering plant in the genus Clerodendrum and family Lamiaceae. It is native to tropical Asia and Papuasia (southern China including Taiwan, Indochina, Bangladesh, Sri Lanka, Andaman & Nicobar Islands, Borneo, Sulawesi, Sumatra, Philippines, Bismarck Archipelago), Fiji, and French Polynesia. It is introduced in Central America.

Gallery

References

paniculatum
Flora of Asia
Flora of Papuasia
Flora of Sri Lanka
Plants described in 1767
Taxa named by Carl Linnaeus